Skonseng is a village in the municipality of Rana in Nordland county, Norway. The village is located along the south side of the river Ranelva where three valleys meet each other: the Dunderland Valley, Plurdal, and Rødvassdal. The village of Røssvoll lies on the north side of the river, just across from Skonseng. The Nordland Line passes through the village. 

Skonseng has several sports arena: Biathlon, cross country skiing, ski jump, beach volleyball, and soccer.

References

Rana, Norway
Villages in Nordland